Robin Evans (8 May 1944 – 19 February 1993) was an architect, teacher and historian. He grew up in Essex, England, attending British state schools where he met his wife, teacher Janet Bance - before studying Architecture at the Architectural Association School of Architecture (the AA), gaining his Diploma and the Bristol Prize (1969).

Evans studied the history of prison architecture for his doctorate. His essays and reviews were published in journals including Lotus, Casa Bella, Architectural Review and AA Files.  He lectured at the Polytechnic of Central London, the Cambridge school of architecture, England, the AA, and the Bartlett School, University College London. Evans also lectured widely in the United States at Harvard, Columbia, Pennsylvania, Princeton, Massachusetts Institute of Technology (MIT), and Cornell.

Before his death he completed The Projective Cast: Architecture and Its Three Geometries (the MIT Press, 1995). A history of architecture from Early Renaissance to post-modernity - Evans writes about architectural concern for the meanings of space and matter, perception and imagination.

References 
 'Robin Michael Evans, 8 May 1944 – 19 February 1993', Memorial Service, Harvard University Graduate School of Design, 5 October 1993. Including transcripts of addresses given by Peter G. Rowe, Homa Fardjadi, Edward Robbins, Robin Middleton and Wendy Kohn.
 Mary McLeod and Robin Middleton, 'Robin Evans,' "Newsline" (Columbia University) April 1993.
 Mark Rakatansky, 'In Memoriam: Robin Evans 1944-1993', Columbia Documents of Architecture and Theory no.3 (1993), pp. 174–82.
 Philip Tabor, 'Oddity of Geometry', review of The Projective Cast, Architectural Review, vol. 198, no. 1181 (July 1995), p. 96.
 Andrew Ballantyne, review of The Projective Cast, Times Literary Supplement, 10 November 1995, p. 16.
 Robert Tavernor, review of The Projective Cast, Architectural Research Quarterly, vol.1, no.2 (Winter 1995), pp. 93–94.
 Joseph Bedford, 'In Front of Lives That Leave Nothing Behind', AA Files 70 (Architectural Association's journal of record, London, 2015).

External links 
Video entries at SCI-Arc Robin Evans Part One and Part Two

1944 births
1993 deaths
20th-century English architects
Alumni of the Architectural Association School of Architecture
Architects from Essex